Wiseana mimica is a species of moth belonging to the family Hepialidae. It was described by Philpott in 1923, and is endemic to New Zealand.

The wingspan is 29–40 mm for males and 41–48 mm for females. The colour of the forewings varies, but is usually dark brown. Adults are on wing from September to February.

References

External links

Hepialidae genera

Hepialidae
Moths described in 1923
Moths of New Zealand
Endemic fauna of New Zealand
Endemic moths of New Zealand